Sonny Clark Trio is an album by jazz pianist Sonny Clark recorded for the Blue Note label and released in May 1958. The trio consists of Clark with Paul Chambers and Philly Joe Jones. The original album comprises six jazz standards; three alternate takes have been added in the CD reissues.

Critical reception 
The album was awarded 4 stars by Michael G. Nastos in an Allmusic review which stated "Mainstream jazz lovers will find much to enjoy about this edition of Clark discography, and a very good primer for recordings of his original music to come later in his career".

Track listing 
 "Be-Bop" (Dizzy Gillespie) - 9:54
 "I Didn't Know What Time It Was" (Richard Rodgers, Lorenz Hart) - 4:22
 "Two Bass Hit" (Gillespie, John Lewis) - 3:45
 "Tadd's Delight" (Tadd Dameron) - 6:02
 "Softly, As in a Morning Sunrise" (Oscar Hammerstein II, Sigmund Romberg) - 6:33
 "I'll Remember April" (Gene DePaul, Patricia Johnston, Don Raye) - 4:55

Bonus tracks on CD:
"I Didn't Know What Time It Was" [Alternate Take] - 4:20
 "Two Bass Hit" [Alternate Take] - 4:01
 "Tadd's Delight" [Alternate Take] - 5:01

Personnel 
Sonny Clark - piano
Paul Chambers - bass (all tracks except "I'll Remember April")
Philly Joe Jones - drums (all tracks except "I'll Remember April")

Production 
 Alfred Lion - producer
 Reid Miles - design
 Rudy Van Gelder - engineer
 Francis Wolff - photography

References 

Sonny Clark albums
1958 albums
Blue Note Records albums
Albums produced by Alfred Lion
Albums recorded at Van Gelder Studio